Independência ou Morte (in English: Independence or Death) is a Brazilian Historical drama film directed by Carlos Coimbra and released on September 2, 1972. is based on the life of Emperor Pedro I of Brazil and Empress Maria Leopoldina of Austria, as well as other facts about the Independence of Brazil, is starring Tarcísio Meira, Glória Menezes, Kate Hansen and Dionísio Azevedo.

At the time of its premiere, around 2,924,494 people saw it, being the most watched film in that year and one in the history of Brazilian cinema.

Plot 
An interviewer begins to interview José Bonifácio who was by the Emperor's side all the time, he begins to tell everything, Pedro  was always friendly with other children even though his mother and father prevented him because he was from the royalty, belonging to the Portuguese Royal Family and for being the Inheritor Viceroy of the Viceroyalty of Brazil, Over time the child Pedro would grow up to his perfect age, his father King John VI of Portugal due to his age he would inherit the throne of the Kingdom of Brazil to Pedro and would be crowned as King of Brazil, at the same time he would meet Maria Leopoldina of Austria with whom he would marry and become the Queen Consort of Brazil, while in the Masonic Palace in Rio de Janeiro, the Freemasons began to organize plans for an independence Revolt against the Portuguese Dominion, due to the neglect of the Colony and the other Independences carried out by the Spanish colonies.

Over time, Pedro would know about the Freemasons and would join them voluntarily although he would do so completely in private, without anyone else knowing, and he would continue to be King of Brazil. As time passed until 1822, the uprisings would begin, commanded by Pedro against the Portuguese, in the end the news would reach him about what the Portuguese jury would do, knowing it, the Portuguese orders him, in fury, he would give a speech to his troops and then the Cry of Ipiranga, after this the Empire would be proclaimed and Pedro I would be crowned as Emperor of Brazil while the Kingdom would be dissolved and at the same time it would be the end of Brazil as a Portuguese Colony, Due to the war he was leading, he would begin to neglect his relationship with his wife, which over time would begin to suffer from an illness. The last year of fighting against the Portuguese army, the news about the birth of his son would reach him and he would leave the battlefield to go see the birth of his son, during the birth of the baby the Empress Leopoldina would be affected even that the baby would be born in good condition, after this Pedro would return to the battlefield to continue leading the troops even though at that moment the weak empress would die, and the news would reach the battlefield where Emperor Pedro would be devastated by the news, After finally having defeated the Portuguese, he would return to Rio, even though not with the motivation of before, and he and the Marchioness of Santos would take care of little Pedro de Alcántara. The depression would begin to affect the emperor, which would lead him to neglect his son and the affairs of the Empire, which would lead him to the decision to go into exile in Portugal.

Bonifácio's interviewer gave his opinion about the figure of Pedro, due to having gone from being a Liberal to being an Absolutist, having reigned twice, being an adorable father and unfaithful husband, Bonifacio would tell him that despite having been all that, Emperor Pedro consolidated the vast empire and guaranteed Brazilian independence, as well as having left Brazil free as a Portuguese colony, then finally, Pedro and others related to him would go by boat into exile to Portugal, saying goodbye to Bonifacio and 5-years-old Pedro de Alcántara.

Cast 

 Tarcísio Meira as Pedro I of Brazil
 Tarcísio Filho as Pedro I (teenager)
 Kate Hansen as Maria Leopoldina of Austria
 Dionísio Azevedo as José Bonifácio de Andrada
 Glória Menezes as Domitila de Castro, Marchioness of Santos
  as John VI of Portugal
 Heloísa Helena as Carlota Joaquina of Spain
  as Francisco Gomes da Silva
 Anselmo Duarte as Joaquim Gonçalves Ledo
 Jairo Arco e Flexa as Lieutenant Canto e Mello
  as José Clemente Pereira
 Maria Cláudia as Amélie of Leuchtenberg
 Francisco Di Franco as Plácido
 José Lewgoy as João Pinto
  as 
  as Martim Francisco Ribeiro de Andrada
 Marcelo Maduar as Younger-Pedro II

References

External links 

1972 films
1970s Portuguese-language films
Brazilian biographical drama films
Films directed by Carlos Coimbra
Films set in the 1800s
Films set in the 1810s
Films set in the 1820s
Adultery in films